is a song by Japanese singer-songwriter Rina Aiuchi. It was released on 1 January 2007 through Giza Studio, as the lead single from her sixth studio album Trip. The single reached number fifteen in Japan and has sold over 15,732 copies nationwide. The song served as the theme songs to the Japanese anime television series, Fist of the Blue Sky.

Track listing

Charts

Weekly charts

Certification and sales

|-
! scope="row"| Japan (RIAJ)
| 
| 15,732
|-
|}

Release history

References

2007 singles
2007 songs
J-pop songs
Song recordings produced by Daiko Nagato
Songs written by Rina Aiuchi